Leon ("Lion") was an  which served in the Royal Hellenic Navy from 1912–1941.

Origin

Leon was originally named Tucumán. They were purchased in 1912 by Greece, ready for delivery, each for the sum of £148,000, when the Balkan Wars seemed likely.

Service history
During the Balkan Wars, the Royal Hellenic Navy purchased only the minimum amount of ammunition, 3,000 rounds. Torpedoes were not available for this class of ship, and for this reason these ships were initially named 'scouts' rather than 'destroyers'.  Leon was in action during the Balkan Wars under Lieutenant Commander J. Razikotsikas, also on board was Squadron Commander Lieutenant Commander D. Papachristos.

During World War I, Greece belatedly entered the war on the side of the Triple Entente and, due to Greece's neutrality the four Aetos-class ships were seized by the Allies in October 1916, taken over by the French in November, and served in the French Navy from 1917-18. By 1918, they were back on escort duty under Greek colors, and was in action blockading the coasts of the Black Sea from Bosphorus up to Trebizond.

On 22 December 1921, while moored with Ierax in Piraeus harbour they were both severely damaged by the explosion of a depth charge which the crew of Leon was transporting. Two officers, one petty officer and two sailors were killed on Leon and two sailors on Ierax. Leon completely lost her aft section up to her stern gun.

After the war, Leon was refurbished from 1925–1927. She also participated in the Second World War, On 18 April 1941, during a convoy escort, she collided with the passenger ship  followed by the explosion of two depth charges. As a result, her stern section was cut off and two officers were killed. She was finally sunk by German bombers on 15 May 1941, in Souda Bay (Crete) where she had been towed from Salamis Naval Base.

See also
History of the Hellenic Navy

References

External links
 A History of Greek Military Equipment (1821-today): Destroyer Leon II

Aetos-class destroyers
World War II destroyers of Greece
World War II shipwrecks in the Mediterranean Sea
1911 ships
Military units and formations of Greece in the Balkan Wars
Maritime incidents in May 1941
Destroyers sunk by aircraft
Ships built on the River Mersey
Ships sunk by German aircraft